The Four Pillars of Destiny, as known as "Ba-Zi", which means "eight characters" or "eight words" in Chinese, is a Chinese astrological concept that a person's destiny or fate can be divined by the two sexagenary cycle characters assigned to their birth year, month, day, and hour. This type of cosmological astrology is also widely used in both South Korea and Japan.

Development 
Four Pillars of Destiny can be dated back to the Han Dynasty, but it was not systematic as it is known today. 

 In the time of Tang dynasty,  Lǐ Xūzhōng (Chinese: 李虛中) reorganized this concept,  and used the each of the two sexagenary cycle characters assigned to a person's birth year, month and date to predict one's personality and future. This was called the "Three Pillars of Destiny", and after this theory become more and more popular.

 During Song Dynasty, Xú Zi Píng (Chinese:徐子平) reformed Lǐ Xūzhōng's "Three Pillars of Destiny" by adding the "birth time" as the fourth pillar. This meant adding another 2 sexagenary cycle characters to the person's fate pillars, from six characters into eight characters, which made the forecast accuracy seem much higher and making the Three Pillars of Destiny more useful. Therefore, people regarded Xú Zi Píng as the creator of a solid foundation for the Four Pillars of Destiny.

Method
Days, hours, months, and years are all assigned one of the ten Celestial Stems (Chinese: 十天干) and one of the twelve Terrestrial Branches (Chinese: 十二地支) in the sexagenary cycle. A person's fortune is determined by looking up the branch and stem characters for each of these four parts of their birth time, with relation to the 10-year luck cycle (Chinese: 十年大运).

Years

Months

Days

Hours

The Schools

The schools are the Scholarly School (學院派, Xué Yuàn Pài) and the Professional School (江湖派, Jiāng Hú Pài).

The Scholarly School began with Xú Zi Píng (徐子平)  at the beginning of the Song Dynasty. Xú founded the pure theoretical basis of the system. Representatives of this school and their publications include:

Song Dynasty (宋)
 Sān Mìng Yuān Yuán 三命渊源, by Xú Dà Shēng 徐大升
 Yuān Hǎi Zi Píng 淵海子平, compiled by Xú Dà Shēng 徐大升 (styled Zi Píng 子平)

Ming Dynasty (明)
 Dī Tiān Suǐ 滴天髓
 Sān Mìng Tōng Kuài 三命通會, by Wàn Mín Yīng 万民英
 Míng Wàn Yù Wú 明萬育吾
 Míng Liú Jī 明劉基

Qing Dynasty (清)
 Mìng Lǐ Yuē Yán 命理約言, by Chén Sù Ān 陈素庵
 Mìng Lǐ Tàn Yuán 命理探源, by Yuán Shù Shān 袁树珊

In Japan

Definitions
Shō-Kan is also the relative pronoun among the Heavenly Stems. A birthday in the Chinese calendar will be written甲子, 甲戌, 甲申, 甲午, 甲辰, 甲寅, whereas the  will belong to the Shō-Kan. When the Heavenly Stems will be 甲 in a birthday for the Chinese calendar, the 丁 acts as a Shō-Kan factor, as follows:
 乙 : 丙
 丙 : 己
 丁 : 戊
 戊 : 辛
 己 : 庚
 庚 : 癸
 辛 : 壬
 壬 : 乙
 癸 : 甲

Meaning 
Generally speaking, Shō-Kan stands for splendid talents, brilliant appearances, and academic potential.
Freedom of speech, freedom of thinking, and freedom of expression are said to be related to Shō-Kan.
When there is not the proper Shō-Kan in daily life, the person is said to become confused and may even become involved in anti-social acts.
Shō-Kan is also the symbol of a sword and slash. 
The figures with Shō-Kan are usually bright and beautiful; however, true and real success in life is another aspect.

Example
Hirohito (also known as Emperor Shōwa), born April 29, 1901, died January 7, 1989. His birthday is 29 April 1901, a day called Shōwa Day in Japan.

The chart is as follows:
Year of birth: 1901 : 辛丑
Month of birth: April : 壬辰
Day of birth: 29th : 丁丑
Time of birth: a quarter past 10 at night (10.15 pm) : 辛亥

The main structure of his chart is 傷官 (Shō-Kan), 格.
The most important element and worker in his chart is the 甲 or 乙. The Inju is also the worker which controls Shō-Kan. In 1945, in the year of 乙酉, the Inju has no effect.
   
Additionally, the Dai Un (Japan's own long-term history) is as follows. The beginning of April in the Lunar calendar is the fifth day, so there are 24 days from day 5 to Hirohito's birthday. One month is equivalent to ten years in Dai Un, and the 24 days are equivalent to eight years. Events in the historical timeline corresponding to his life from age eight to 18 are as follows.

From the age of 8 to the age of 18 : 辛卯 
18 to 28: 庚寅 : corresponding to the reign and beginning of Showa Period in 1926
28 to 38: 己丑 : beginning of Second Sino-Japanese War in 1937
38 to 48: 戊子 : World War II, 1939–1945
48 to 58: 丁亥
58 to 68: 丙戌
68 to 78: 乙酉
78 to 88: 甲申 : end of the Showa Period in 1989
88 to 98: 癸未

Advocates of the Shō-Kan system believe that Hirohito's chart somehow explains the defeat of Japan in World War II after the catastrophic atomic bomb explosions at Hiroshima and Nagasaki.

Periodicity of Four Pillars
The problem of periodicity of four pillars is a problem in calendrical arithmetics, but most of fortune tellers are unable to handle the mathematics correctly. Hee  for example, proposed that it takes 240 years for a given four-pillar quadruplet to repeat itself. In p. 22, Hee wrote, ... because of the numerous possible combinations, it takes 60 years for the same set of year pillars to repeat itself (by comparison, as set of month pillars repeats itself after just five years). Therefore, if you have a certain day and time, the set of four pillars will repeat itself in 60 years. However, since the same day may not appear in exactly the same month – and even if it is in the same month, the day may not be found in the same half month – it takes 240 years before the identical four pillars appear again ...Hee's proposal is incorrect and can be easily refuted by a counterexample. For example, the four-pillar quadruplets for 1984-3-18 and 2044-3-3 are exactly the same (i.e. 甲子-丁卯-辛亥-xx) and they are spaced only by 60 years. But the next iso-quadruplet will reappear only after 360 years (on 2404-4-5). Furthermore, a periodicity of 1800 years is needed to order to match both sexagenary cycle and the Gregorian cycle. For example, 4-3-18, 1980-3-18, and 3964-3-18 share the same four-pillar quadruplet.

The solution to the iso-Gregorian quadruplet is a Diophantine problem.

to which one of the solution is  Therefore days or about 1800 Gregorian years.

See also

 Destiny
 Symbolic stars
 Astrology
 Zǐ wēi dòu shù—a Chinese lunar astrological method
 Wikibooks: Ba Zi

References 

Asian culture
Chinese astrology
Divination
Taoist divination